Sven Strüver (born 9 August 1967) is a German professional golfer.

Early life and professional career
Strüver was born in Bremen. In the 1989 German Open, he shot a 62 in the second round to set a new record for the lowest round by an amateur in a European Tour event. The record was equalled by Shane Lowry in the 2009 Irish Open.

After reaching the final in the 1990 Spanish International Amateur Championship, losing to Darren Clarke, Strüver turned professional in and won the German PGA Championship that year. He joined the European Tour in 1992, and reached his peak during the mid to late 1990s, when he won three tournaments and consistently finished inside the top 50 on the Order of Merit. His best season was 1998, when he captured the Canon European Masters and finished 13th on the Order of Merit having missed just two cuts all season.

Since 2003, Strüver has failed to win enough money to retain his European Tour card automatically and visited the end of season tour qualifying school every year through 2007, regaining his card on three occasions.

Amateur wins
1986 German Amateur Closed Championship

Professional wins (5)

European Tour wins (3)

*Note: The 1996 Alfred Dunhill South African PGA Championship was shortened to 54 holes due to rain.
1Co-sanctioned by the Sunshine Tour

European Tour playoff record (1–0)

Other wins (2)

Results in major championships

Note: Strüver never played in the Masters Tournament.

CUT = missed the half-way cut
"T" = tied

Team appearances
Amateur
European Boys' Team Championship (representing West Germany): 1985
Eisenhower Trophy (representing West Germany): 1986, 1988
European Amateur Team Championship (representing West Germany): 1987, 1989
St Andrews Trophy (representing the Continent of Europe): 1988

Professional
World Cup (representing Germany): 1993, 1994, 1995, 1997, 1998, 1999, 2002
Alfred Dunhill Cup (representing Germany): 1994, 1995, 1996, 1997, 1998, 2000

See also
2006 European Tour Qualifying School graduates
2007 European Tour Qualifying School graduates

References

External links

German male golfers
European Tour golfers
Sportspeople from Bremen
1967 births
Living people